The Beierle Farm near Watkins, Colorado was started in 1890.  It was listed on the National Register of Historic Places in 1992 but was later delisted.

It was farmed by Ray Beierle and family.  He farmed there from 1929 to 1938, moved to a farm near Erie (about 30 miles away), then returned in 1945.  The family remained at the Beierle Farm until 1990.

It included Late 19th and Early 20th Century American Movements architecture. It was also known as Arter Farm, as Knapff Farm, and as Hill Farm.

It was delisted from the National Register on  after demolition.

References

1890 establishments in Colorado
Farms on the National Register of Historic Places in Colorado
Former National Register of Historic Places in Colorado
Late 19th and Early 20th Century American Movements architecture
Historic districts on the National Register of Historic Places in Colorado
National Register of Historic Places in Adams County, Colorado
National Register of Historic Places in Arapahoe County, Colorado